Liliana Del Carmen Estefan (born March 20, 1967) is a Cuban American model and television presenter, known as the co-host of El Gordo y la Flaca on Univision.

Biography 
Lili Estefan was born on March 20, 1967, in Santiago de Cuba. Lili's father is José Estefan (b. 1945). Upon losing her mother at the age of ten, Lili emigrated to the United States with her widower father and younger brother Juan Emilio (b. 1967). She is the paternal niece of music producer Emilio Estefan, whose wife is singer Gloria Estefan.

Career

Sábado Gigante 
Estefan first came to the spotlight in 1986, when she was hired by Univision to participate as a model on the television show Sábado Gigante. She quickly became a favorite of the audience and the show host, Don Francisco. Estefan appeared on Francisco's program Don Francisco Presenta on numerous occasions.

El Gordo y la Flaca 
Estefan has co-hosted Univision's daytime talk show El Gordo y la Flaca with Raúl De Molina since 1998. Estefan earned her nickname "La Flaca" ("The Skinny Girl") from the show.

Mira Quien Baila 
Estefan is one of the judges on Mira Quien Baila with a panel that includes Horacio Villalobos and Bianca Marroquín.

Red Table Talk: The Estefans 
In 2020, Estefan became a co-host of Red Table Talk: The Estefans, a spin-off of the Facebook Watch talk show Red Table Talk alongside her aunt Gloria Estefan and paternal cousin Emily.

Awards and honors 
In 2015, Lili Estefan received the Lifetime Achievement Award at the 33rd Annual Premios TVyNovelas, presented by Televisa.  In 2016, Estefan and her co-host of El Gordo y La Flaca, Raúl de Molina, were honored with the award for Outstanding Achievement in Hispanic Television, at the 14th Annual Hispanic Television Summit, presented by Broadcasting & Cable and Multichannel News, and produced by Schramm Marketing Group.  In 2017, Estefan received the Career Award at the Premio Lo Nuestro Awards, presented by Univision. In 2018, she received a Daytime Talent in Spanish Emmy Award from The National Academy of Television Arts & Sciences.

Personal life 
Estefan married Cuban businessman Lorenzo Luaces in 1992. In 2018 it was announced that they were divorcing. They have two children: Lorenzo Luaces Jr. (b. 1999) and Lina Teresa Luaces (b. 2002).

See also 
List of television presenters § Cuba

References

External links 

Cuban television presenters
Cuban women television presenters
Cuban people of Lebanese descent
American people of Lebanese descent
Place of birth missing (living people)
Exiles of the Cuban Revolution in the United States
1967 births
Living people
Hispanic and Latino American female models
American television hosts
American women television presenters
21st-century American women